Fine Prey is a science fiction novel by Scott Westerfeld.

References

1998 American novels
Novels by Scott Westerfeld